The First Secretary of the Udmurt regional branch of the Communist Party of the Soviet Union was the position of highest authority in the Votyak AO (1920–1932), Udmurt AO (1932–1934) and the Udmurt ASSR (1934–1991) in the Russian SFSR of the Soviet Union. The position was created in February, 1920, and abolished in August 1991. The First Secretary was a de facto appointed position usually by the Politburo or the General Secretary himself.

List of First Secretaries of the Udmurt Communist Party

See also
Udmurt Autonomous Oblast
Udmurt Autonomous Soviet Socialist Republic

Notes

Sources
 World Statesmen.org

1921 establishments in Russia
1991 disestablishments in the Soviet Union
Regional Committees of the Communist Party of the Soviet Union
Politics of Udmurtia